"Muérdete La Lengua" (Translated to 'Bite Your Tongue' in English) is a rock song recorded by Chilean singer and song-writer Francisca Valenzuela and this song is the third official single from her first solo debut studio album, Muérdete La Lengua, released in Chile on September 15, 2007.

Song information
The song, written during 2005 by Francisca Valenzuela, was produced by Mauricio Durán and Francisco Durán, members of Chilean Rock band Los Bunkers. The song was released on September 15, 2007 on Radios and Digital Download.

Music video

The official music video for the song "Muérdete La Lengua" was premiered on MTV Latin America on September 30, 2007 with high popularity in Chilean music channels. It was later premiered on Via X and Zona Latina. The music video was directed by Igal Weitzman and in it Francisca is shown singing in psychedelic screenshoots with her face painted in white along with dogs.

References

External links
 
Official Music website
Official MySpace
Official Blog
Lyrics of this song – Muérdete La Lengua

2007 singles
Francisca Valenzuela songs
Songs written by Francisca Valenzuela
2007 songs